is a lava dome located in the Nipesotsu-Maruyama Volcanic Group of the Ishikari Mountains, Hokkaidō, Japan. Only in 1989 did scientists discover that Mount Maru is a quaternary volcano. The mountain sits on the border between the towns of Kamishihoro and Shintoku.

Geology
The western flank of the mountain shows accretionary complex from the late Eocene to the early Miocene. The eastern flank shows non-alkaline mafic volcanic rock from the early to middle Miocene. The mountain is topped with non-alkaline mafic rock from the middle Pleistocene.

Eruptive history
Other than fumaroles, the last eruption of Mount Maru, according to historical records, was from approximately December 3, 1898 to December 6. Before that the last eruption was approximately 1700 BC.

See Also
List of volcanoes in Japan
List of mountains in Japan

References

Maru
Maru
Maru